is a manga by Chieko Hosokawa about the training of flight attendants for Japan Airlines originally serialized in Shōjo Friend from Kodansha beginning in 1970. Tokyo Broadcasting System adapted a TV drama from the manga in 1970. Thirty-six years later, Fuji TV produced a new drama series in 2006. The name of the character, Yōko Misaki was used in both versions.

1970 version

Cast

2006 version

Episodes
The 2006 program follows the life of Misaki as she slowly conquers various obstacles to become a flight attendant. Each episode ends with a showcase of the various uniforms that have been used in JAL to a cover of "Oh Pretty Woman" by Kaela Kimura.

Cast

Aya Ueto as Misaki Youko
Ryo Nishikido as Nakahara Shota
Miki Maya as Mikami Tamaki
Saki Aibu as Wakamura Yayoi
Chihiro Otsuka as Sekiyama Yuki
Misa Uehara as Hirota Saori
Kotaro Koizumi as Tsutsumi Shuusuke
Fumiyo Kohinata as Sakurada Shinya
Yuko Fueki as Asou Kaoru
Natsumi Nanase as Kinoshita Asami
Minami Otomo as Higashino Haruka
Mariko Takahashi as Kagawa Reiko
Mantaro Koichi as Watanabe Makoto
Kazuyuki Asano as Wakamura Shozo 
Inoue Jun as Dazai Shinichiro
Mano Yuuko as Murayama Mizuho
Hoshino Natsuko as Takemoto Rie
Tanaka Sogen as Ooki Mitsuya
Ishikawa Maki as Chief Nagano

Misaki is a lead singer of a rock band. She lost her mother at young age and was raised with her three brothers. She is very boyish in nature and prefers male to female company. She enrolls to become a flight attendant to gain the attention of another band member after he mentions about how she would look like in a uniform. She finds training in flight attendant academy to be difficult but manages to overcome various obstacles with a unique persistence. She slowly wins respect of her instructors and batchmates.

Shōta is a mechanic working for JAL. He has always wanted to be a pilot on a commercial airliner but could not become one as he did not have perfect eyesight. He is still allowed to pilot small aircraft and takes Misaki on a trip during the series to cheer her up. He first met her in the first episode where she accuses him of stealing her train ticket. Reserved and quiet, he and Misaki initially do not get along however become close friends by the end of the series.

Soundtrack

 Oh Pretty Woman - Kaela Kimura
 Attention Please  ~ Main Theme
 What Am I Gonna Do
 Head Wind
 Circle of my Life
 A Goody Goody
 Attention Please ~ (Love Theme)
 Turbulence
 Mock up
 Fight Irregularity
 Go Around
 Stage of The Sky
 Normally Hidden Function
 Do Really
 Break Down
 Painful And Embarrassed
 Link to The Future
 Attention Please ~ (End Title)
 Oh Pretty Woman ~ (Instrumental)

January 2007 special
A special was aired in January 2007. Misaki was given her first international assignment to Hawaii. In this special Misaki has to play matchmaker to bring two people together. At the end, Misaki gains the courage and is about to tell Shota that she likes him but is interrupted with a rare green sunset, 'Green Flash' in Hawaii. That sunset foretells that a couple who sees the Green Flash will live happily together forever.

Cast

Aya Ueto as Misaki Youko
Ryo Nishikido as Nakahara Shota
Miki Maya as Mikami Tamaki
Saki Aibu as Wakamura Yayoi
Chihiro Otsuka as Sekiyama Yuki
Misa Uehara as Hirota Saori
Kotaro Koizumi as Tsutsumi Shuusuke
Yuko Fueki as Asou Kaoru
Natsuki Harada as Risa Nakata
Bokuzo Masana as Todoroki Hiroto
Hori Mayumi as Ito Nanako
Ito Masayuki as a passenger
David Hirokane as Mr. Nakata
Yatsu Isao as the taxi driver
Ideguchi Tetsuya & Kawamoto Chiaki as the newlyweds
Katsukura Keiko as a passenger
Taira Chiharu as the young mother
Yamase Shota as the high-spirited child

April 2008 special
There was a second special aired in April 2008. Misaki imagines and dreams of becoming the top cabin attendant in the world. She has ongoing conflicts with a new trainee CA, who is serious. She then heads to Sydney with Wakamura and Sekiyama and gets into an argument with them as Misaki is trying to steal the spotlight for a blog on their airlines CA website. Meanwhile, Sekiyama has feelings for Tsutsumi, but gets upset when he flirts with another woman while Wakamura worries about her father's health. On the other hand, it is revealed that Shōta is in India.

Cast
Aya Ueto - Youko Misaki (Flight Attendant Trainee)
Ryo Nishikido - Shota Nakahara (Flight Engineer)
Maya Miki - Tamaki Mikami (Flight Attandent Trainee Instructor)
Saki Aibu - Yayoi Wakamura (Flight Attendant Trainee)
Misa Uehara - Saori Hirota (Flight Attendant Trainee)
Chihiro Otsuka - Yuki Sekiyama (Flight Attendant Trainee)
Fumiyo Kohinata - Shinya Sakurada (Pilot)
Koutaro Koizumi - Shusuke Tsutsumi (Inexperienced Pilot)
Yuko Fueki - Kaoru Asou (Senior Flight Attendant)
Minami Ootomo - Haruka Higashino (Flight Attendant Trainee)
Natsumi Nanase - Asami Kinoshita (Flight Attendant Trainee Instructor)
Mariko Takahashi - Reiko Kagawa (ep.1-4)
Mantaro Koichi - Makoto Watanabe (Flight Engineer)
Kazuyuki Asano - Shozo Wakamura (Noodle Shop Owner, Yayoi's father)
Jun Inoue - Shinichirō Dazai (Department Head of Flight Attendant Trainee)
Yuuko Mano - Mizuho Murayama (Senior Flight Attendant)
Natsuko Hoshino - Rie Takemoto (Flight Attendant Trainee)

References

External links

 Official site
 FAQ about series 
 

1970 Japanese television series debuts
1971 Japanese television series endings
2006 Japanese television series debuts
2006 Japanese television series endings
Aviation television series
Fuji TV dramas
Japanese drama television series
Kodansha manga
Manga adapted into television series
Shōjo manga
TBS Television (Japan) dramas
Works about flight attendants